General elections are due to be held in Namibia in 2024.

Electoral system 
The President of Namibia is elected using the two-round system; if no candidate receives more than 50% in the first round of voting, a run-off will be held. No previous presidential votes in Namibia have gone to a second round.

The 104 members of the National Assembly consist of 96 elected members and eight (non-voting) members appointed by the President. The 96 elected members are elected by closed list proportional representation from 14 multi-member constituencies based on the regions. Seats are allocated using the largest remainder method.

References 

Namibia
General election
Elections in Namibia